is a Japanese politician of the Democratic Party of Japan, a member of the House of Councillors in the Diet (national legislature). A native of Nagoya, Aichi and graduate of Aichi University of Education, he was elected to the House of Representatives for the first time in 1990 after teaching at local public schools. In 1996, he lost re-election but was elected to House of Councillors for the first time in 1998.

References

External links 
  in Japanese.

1943 births
Living people
People from Nagoya
Members of the House of Representatives (Japan)
Members of the House of Councillors (Japan)
Democratic Party of Japan politicians
Aichi University of Education alumni